Bayat Castle is in Kebirli village of Tartar Rayon of the Republic of Azerbaijan.

History
After the death of Iranian ruler Nader Shah (1736-1747), several khanates were established on the territory that constitutes the present-day Republic of Azerbaijan. One of these was the Karabakh Khanate founded by Panah Ali Khan Javanshir. The first capital of the khanate was the Bayat Castle built in 1748 in Kebirli mahali (province). The name of the Bayat castle was given in honour of the Turkic Bayat clan. The castle included all strategic defense structures such as walls warfare trenches and had a market, bath house and a mosque. It was built with hard burned bricks. When the construction of the castle was finalized Panah Ali Khan moved all of his court to the castle.

The capital was therefore soon moved to the newly constructed Shahbulag Castle located in lowland Karabakh in 1752. Eventually, with an intent to secure the entity from external threats, especially from Iran, Panah Ali Khan moved the capital to its final location, Shusha, a more reliable natural fortress located on a hardly penetratable mountain rock.

Current state
Bayat castle is among the most valuable historic and cultural monuments of Azerbaijan. It is one of the monuments that partially survived after more than two centuries

See also
Shahbulag Castle
Shusha
Shusha State Historical and Architectural Reserve

References

Houses completed in 1748
Palaces in Azerbaijan
Tourist attractions in Azerbaijan
Royal residences in Azerbaijan
Islamic architecture
Architecture in Azerbaijan
Castles and fortresses in Azerbaijan
Bayat tribe